Nizami, Gəncə is a village in the Goygol Rayon of Azerbaijan.  The village forms part of the municipality of Zurnabad.

References 

Populated places in Goygol District